Erlang railway station is a station on the Chinese Qingzang Railway. It is located in Wulan County, Qinghai Province, China

See also
 Qingzang Railway
 List of stations on Qingzang railway

Railway stations in Qinghai
Stations on the Qinghai–Tibet Railway